OEX may refer to :

 Orbital experiments, by NASA
 Château-d'Œx, Switzerland
 Oëx, France
 S&P 100 ticker symbol